Myrmicacin (3-hydroxydecanoic acid) is a chemical compound of the β-hydroxycarboxylic acid class. It is named after the South American leaf-cutter ants (Myrmicinae) in which it was first discovered, but is also found in royal jelly. Myrmicacin is believed to act as a herbicide which prevents seeds collected by the ants from germinating within the nest.

See also
 3,10-Dihydroxydecanoic acid
 3,11-Dihydroxydodecanoic acid

References

Fatty acids
Beta hydroxy acids
Bee products